RBC WaterPark Place is an office complex designed by WZMH Architects and located at 88 Queens Quay West in Toronto, Canada.

The tower began construction in 2011 and was completed in 2014. When proposed the building was to have taken over head office operations from Royal Bank Plaza and now houses some of the bank's operations.

WaterPark Place I and II

The complex also consists of the twin WaterPark Place, a pair of office towers at 10 Bay Street (18 floors, c. 1990) and 20 Bay Street (24 floors, c. 1986) and connected to Union Station via PATH network.

See also
 Royal Bank Plaza, Toronto – de facto head office of Royal Bank
 RBC Centre, Toronto – home to RBC operations in the GTA
 Place Ville Marie, Montreal – former headquarters of RBC and retained for the bank's legal head office and other RBC operations in Montreal
 Bay Park Centre, Toronto – future head office of CIBC
 Royal Bank Building (Toronto)

References

Skyscrapers in Toronto
Office buildings completed in 2014
Bank buildings in Canada
Royal Bank of Canada
WZMH Architects buildings